Mexico–Serbia relations are the diplomatic relations between Mexico and Serbia. Both nations were founding members of the Group of 77 and the United Nations.

History

Mexico and the SFR Yugoslavia established diplomatic relations on 24 May 1946. In 1951, Mexico opened a resident embassy in Belgrade. In March 1963, Mexican President Adolfo López Mateos paid an official visit to Serbia. During President López Mateos visit, Mexico awarded its highest honor, the Order of the Aztec Eagle, to President Josip Broz Tito. The visit was soon reciprocated when in October 1963, Yugoslav President Tito paid an official visit to Mexico. Since the initial visits, there have been several high-level visits between leaders of both nations.

In 1991, Yugoslavia entered into a series of ethnic conflicts known as the Yugoslav wars. During the war, the United Nations Security Council passed Resolution 757 calling all nations to remove their diplomatic staff from  Belgrade. As a result, Mexico downgraded its embassy to that of a Chargé d'affaires and refused the entry of any Yugoslav official wishing to visit Mexico. Furthermore, Mexican government officials were not allowed to travel to Yugoslavia. By doing so, however, Mexico remained one of the few countries that opted not to close its embassy in Belgrade. In 1995, Mexico elevated its diplomatic mission in Belgrade back to an embassy and established diplomatic relations with the Federal Republic of Yugoslavia (later known as Serbia and Montenegro) as the successor of the Federal Republic of Yugoslavia (e.g. not the pre-war SFR Yugoslavia); and with the other newly independent successor nations of Bosnia and Herzegovina, Croatia, Slovenia  and the Republic of Macedonia.

In 2006, the state union between Serbia and Montenegro dissolved and created two separate nations: the Republic of Serbia and Montenegro. That same year, Mexico recognized the independence of Montenegro and continues to maintain diplomatic relations with the Republic of Serbia. Mexico has not recognized Kosovo since it declared its independence from Serbia in 2008. In 2021, Mexico and Serbia celebrated 75 years of diplomatic relations.

High-level visits

High-level visits from Mexico to the SF Republic of Yugoslavia/Serbia

 President Adolfo López Mateos (1963)
 President Luis Echeverría Álvarez (1974)
 President Miguel de la Madrid Hurtado (1985)
 Foreign Minister Patricia Espinosa Cantellano (2011)

High-level visits from SF Republic of Yugoslavia/Serbia to Mexico

 President Josip Broz Tito (1963 & 1976)
 President Sergej Kraigher (1981)
 President Lazar Mojsov (1987)
 Foreign Minister Vuk Jeremić (2008 & 2011)
 First Deputy Prime Minister Ivica Dačić (2012 & 2015)
 Foreign Minister Nikola Selaković (2021)

Bilateral agreements
Agreements between Mexico and SF Yugoslavia are being carried forward into agreements between Mexico and Serbia. In March 1950, both nations signed an agreement to establish trade relations. In March 1960 a cultural exchange agreement was signed and an additional protocol trade agreement was signed in July 1963. In addition, a scientific and technical cooperation agreement was signed between both nations in February 1974. In July 2010, an agricultural agreement was signed between both nations.

Trade
In 2018, two-way trade between Mexico and Serbia amounted to US$45 million. Mexico's main exports to Serbia include: computer memories and mother boards, tobacco and minerals; while Serbia's main exports to Mexico include: car tires and clothing. Mexican multinational company América Móvil operates in Serbia.

Famous Serbs in Mexico
As manager, Bora Milutinović led the Mexico national football team to the 1986 FIFA World Cup knock-out stage.

Resident diplomatic missions
 Mexico has an embassy in Belgrade.
 Serbia has an embassy in Mexico City.

See also
 List of ambassadors of Mexico to Serbia
 Mexico–Yugoslavia relations
 Serbian diaspora

References

 
Serbia
Bilateral relations of Serbia